Hit the Road is a 2021 Iranian road comedy-drama film written and directed by Panah Panahi in his feature debut. It depicts an Iranian family driving to the Turkish border to smuggle their young adult son out of the country. It premiered in the Directors' Fortnight sidebar at the 2021 Cannes Film Festival, and won top prizes at the BFI London Film Festival and the Singapore International Film Festival.

Cast
 Hassan Madjooni as Khosrow, the father
 Pantea Panahiha as the mother
 Rayan Sarlak as the younger brother
 Amin Simiar as Farid, the elder brother

Release
In July 2021, Picturehouse Entertainment acquired distribution rights to the film for the United Kingdom and Ireland. In August 2021, Kino Lorber acquired US rights. The film was released in the US on 22 April 2022.

Reception
On review aggregator website Rotten Tomatoes, the film holds an approval rating of 95%, based on 91 reviews, and an average rating of 8.4/10. On Metacritic, the film has a weighted average score of 90 out of 100, based on 28 critics, indicating "universal acclaim".

Wendy Ide of Screen International wrote, "Thrillingly inventive, satisfyingly textured and infused with warmth and humanity, this is a triumph." Jessica Kiang of Variety wrote, "its 93 minutes whip by so airily, it's possible not to realize how much you've learned to love the family whose road trip you've shared in, until the credits roll and you immediately start to miss them."

David Ehrlich at IndieWire gave the film an A− grade, calling it "a film that swerves between tragedy and gallows humor with the expert control of a stunt driver". Roxana Hadadi of New York wrote, "There is a sparseness to Hit the Road that reveals the intuitiveness of Panahi's filmmaking, his grasp of these characters and how they tug and poke at each other, and his understanding of the ways fear, paranoia, and loss turn us into people we might not like, let alone recognize."

References

External links
 

2021 films
2020s Persian-language films
2021 comedy-drama films
2020s road comedy-drama films
Iranian comedy-drama films
Films set in Iran
Films shot in Iran